The Hexham Courant is a weekly newspaper serving primarily the area known as Tynedale in Northumberland. First published in 1864, it now reaches around 45,000 people every week. The paper focuses on local issues and people and provides news from local events including sporting activities. There is a classified advertisement section and a letters page.

The full name of the newspaper is Hexham Courant incorporating Alston Herald, Hexham Herald, Haltwhistle Herald and Haltwhistle Echo, as shown on the final page of the newspaper (10 January 2014 edition).

On 23 February 2018, the Courant was sold in a takeover deal to the CN Group. It lost its independent status, but a senior executive claimed that it will transform the Courant into a modern day newspaper. Many critics claim that this takeover has lowered the standards of the courant, with many social media posts being about national news, rather than more local news.

References

External links 
 Official website

1864 establishments in England
Newspapers published in Northumberland
Publications established in 1864
Weekly newspapers published in the United Kingdom
Hexham